Marco Armani, stage name of Marco Antonio Armenise (born 14 June 1961), is an Italian singer-songwriter and composer.

Background 
Born in Bari, while still being a student at the conservatory of his hometown, in 1982 Armani debuted as a singer participating at the RAI musical contest Azzurro. In 1983 he entered the competition at the Sanremo Music Festival,  where he ranked tenth with the song "E' la vita". He then participated at the Sanremo Festival four more times, between 1984 and 1994. His most successful song is "Solo con l'anima mia", which ranked #25 on the Italian hit parade.

In 2017, his song "E' la vita" was included on the original motion picture soundtrack for Call Me by Your Name.

Discography
Album 
     1985: Le cose che vanno lontano (Cinevox, SC 33/52)
     1988: Molti volti (Cinevox, SC 3357)
     1991: Posso pensare a te? (Fonit Cetra, LPX 276)  
     1994: Esser duri (Bubble Record, TCD – BLU 1845)
     1997: 13 (BMG Ricordi, PPM - BMG RICORDI 74321500112)
     1999: Il meglio (DV More Record CD DV 6395)
     2007: Parlami d'amore (Cinevox, CD SC 74)

References

External links
 
 

1961 births
People from Bari
Italian pop singers
Italian male singer-songwriters
Italian singer-songwriters
Living people